was a town in Izushi District, Hyōgo Prefecture, Japan.

, Tantō district has an estimated population of 4,742.

On April 1, 2005, Tantō, along with the towns of Kinosaki, Hidaka and Takeno (all from Kinosaki District), and the town of Izushi (also from Izushi District), was merged into the expanded city of Toyooka, and no longer exists as an independent municipality.

References

External links
 Official website of Toyooka 

Dissolved municipalities of Hyōgo Prefecture
Toyooka, Hyōgo